Dasochori is a settlement in the Grevena regional unit, northern Greece. It is part of the municipality Deskati.

The Kavala VoA-Transmitter, a large facility for shortwave and mediumwave broadcasting, is located west of Dasochori.

Populated places in Grevena (regional unit)